Abdsamiya (Hatran Aramaic: 𐣯𐣡𐣣𐣮𐣬𐣩𐣠) was a king of Hatra, an ancient city and kingdom in ancient Mesopotamia (Iraq). He reigned from about AD 180 to 205. Abdsamiya was the son of king Sanatruq I and the father of Sanatruq II. Abdsamiya is known from eight inscriptions found at Hatra. One of them reports the building of a porticus for the king and is dated to year 504 of the Seleucid era (AD 192/93). Another inscription appears on a statue and is dated to AD 201/202. Abdsamiya is most likely also mentioned by Herodian (3.1.3). There he appears as Barsemias. He supported in year AD 192 Pescennius Niger against Septimius Severus.

References

Literature 
Michael Sommer: Hatra. Geschichte und Kultur einer Karawanenstadt im römisch-parthischen Mesopotamien. von Zabern, Mainz 2003, p. 23-24.

2nd-century Arabs
3rd-century Arabs
Hatra
2nd-century monarchs in the Middle East
Vassal rulers of the Parthian Empire